Lenotetrops is a genus of longhorn beetles, containing a single species, L. ivanovae, found in Afghanistan.

References

External links

Tetropini
Monotypic Cerambycidae genera